Saidiyeh is an alternate name of Soltaniyeh, a city in Zanjan Province, Iran.

Saidiyeh or Saeedīyeh may also refer to:
Saidiyeh, Khuzestan
Saidiyeh, Markazi
Saidiyeh, Razavi Khorasan
Saidiyeh Rural District, in Khuzestan Province